Daphne alpina is a shrub, of the family Thymelaeaceae.  It is deciduous, and is found in southern and central Europe.

Description
The shrub has an erect habit, and grows to a height of 40 to 60 cm.  It grows leaves that are 1 to 4 cm long and small white flowers that are 8 to 10 mm. It is found in limestone rocks at an altitude from 300 to 1500 m.

References

alpina